Hugh Alexander Robertson (20 October 1884 – 12 September 1977) was a New Zealand lawn bowls player who won a gold medal in the men's fours at the 1938 British Empire Games. He also won two national lawn bowls titles.

Biography
Born on 20 October 1884, Robertson was the son of Euphemia and David Scott Robertson. He was a member of a pioneer farming family in Māngere. In Onehunga on 28 October 1924, he married Norma Moore (née Moore), who had a son from a previous marriage.

At the 1938 British Empire Games in Sydney, Robertson was part of the New Zealand men's fours team that won the gold medal, along with Bill Bremner, Ernie Jury and Bill Whittaker.

A member of the Onehunga Bowling Club, Robertson won two New Zealand national bowls championship titles in the men's fours, in 1940 and 1948.

Robertson was a dairy farmer at Robertson Road, Māngere, supplying town milk, until retiring in 1942. He died on 12 September 1977, and his body was cremated at Purewa Crematorium, Auckland. He was predeceased by his wife, Norma, in 1968.

References

1884 births
1977 deaths
Sportspeople from Auckland
New Zealand farmers
New Zealand male bowls players
Commonwealth Games gold medallists for New Zealand
Bowls players at the 1938 British Empire Games
Commonwealth Games medallists in lawn bowls
People from Māngere
19th-century New Zealand people
20th-century New Zealand people
Medallists at the 1938 British Empire Games